Gabriel Tęczyński (1572–1617) was a Polish noble who governed the Lublin Voivode during the Polish–Lithuanian Commonwealth.

1572 births
1617 deaths
Gabriel